The Only Thing I Ever Wanted is the second album by Psapp.  The album reached the UK Top 75 and the US Billboard 200 Albums, selling in excess of 8,000 copies in total.

Track listing

Personnel

Psapp

Carim Clasmann
Galia Durant

Additional personnel

Markus Liebetanz - drums, "Hi" and "Hill Of Our Home"
Ben Eshmade - French horn, "This Way" and "Upstairs"
Gwen Cheeseman - violin, "This Way"
Sybarite - samples, "King Of You"
Pete Norman - mastering

Alternate version

A two-disc promotional version of the album was released in the UK, marked "not for sale" on the discs.  Disc one is the same as the regular release, while disc two features instrumental versions of all of the album's songs. There is a discrepancy in disc two's track listing; "Tricycle" was actually mastered as track five and "New Rubbers" as track six.

Notes

"Tricycle" was the first single from the album to be released in Europe, while "Hi" was the first single released in the U.S.
"King of You" was later featured on Sybarite's Cut out Shape as "Runaway."  Under this title, it was featured in a season three episode of Grey's Anatomy called "Wishin' and Hopin'."
As an example of Psapp's use of found sounds, some of the sounds used on "Needle and Thread" include:
The bass drum sound is made of two cardboard boxes; one wet, one dry.
Some of the additional percussion sounds are "bits of wood being hit together."
The low rattling at the end of the song is Durant's mother's garden table.
The repeated melody throughout is a kalimba.
A Rhodes piano.
Another thumping sound was made with drumsticks banging on the couch.
Kitchen utensils.
The sound samples used for "Upstairs" were recorded at Clasmann and Durant's shared flat shortly before it was demolished.  The pair "spent hours recording the creak of the floorboards and the dry electricity of the carpet. They knocked on the hollow spaces in the walls; they stomped up the staircase."

References

External links
Psapp official website
Psapp jumble shop (official)
The Only Thing I Ever Wanted at Domino Records
Psapp at Domino Records

2006 albums
Domino Recording Company albums
Psapp albums